Leiosella is a genus of sponges belonging to the family Spongiidae.

The species of this genus are found in America and Australia.

Species:

Leiosella arbuscula 
Leiosella caliculata 
Leiosella elegans 
Leiosella flabellum 
Leiosella idea 
Leiosella idia 
Leiosella levis 
Leiosella ramosa 
Leiosella silicata

References

Spongiidae
Sponge genera